Masjid-an-Noor is the first, and currently only, mosque in the province of Newfoundland and Labrador, Canada. The mosque is located in the provincial capital of St. John's, and was built in 1990 by the Muslim Association of Newfoundland and Labrador. A large proportion of the congregation are students or faculty at the Memorial University of Newfoundland.  

A 2016 Master's degree thesis has studied the mosque and the role of five-times-daily prayer in the lives of Muslims who have immigrated to Newfoundland.

It is the only mosque in the province and, as such, has been turned to for reaction to events involving Islam and mosques in the news, such as the March 2019 shootings in Christchurch, New Zealand;  in Newfoundland, Masjid-an-Noor held memorial services.
An event at St. John's Farmers Market was held to express support for Newfoundland Muslims; some came to the event after hearing of it on CBC News. Messages of support were also delivered to the mosque itself. It is the most eastern mosque in Canada.

See also

List of mosques in Canada
  List of mosques in the Americas
  Lists of mosques

References

External links

Mosques in Newfoundland and Labrador
Buildings and structures in St. John's, Newfoundland and Labrador
1990 establishments in Newfoundland and Labrador